Aeolian Airlines was a charter airline based in Athens, Greece. Its main base was Athens International Airport.

History
Aeolian Airlines was founded in February 2011, and commenced operations in March 2011 with a single McDonnell Douglas MD-83. In 2012, the airline received two Airbus A320 aircraft. Aeolian airlines mainly operated charter flights from Athens to destinations in Europe and the Middle East. Aeolian Airlines also operated some scheduled services, mainly within Greece. Aeolian offered the fleet for dry lease.

Destinations

 Greece
Athens - Athens International Airport - Base

Fleet

, the Aeolian Airlines fleet includes the following aircraft:

References

External links

Defunct airlines of Greece
Airlines established in 2011
Airlines disestablished in 2012
Greek companies established in 2011
Defunct charter airlines